Ryan Canning (born 22 February 1984 in Cape Town) is a South African cricketer. He plays for Western Cape Province as a wicket-keeper batsman. Canning has had to serve as understudy to former Cobras captain Thami Tsolekile, playing for the Western Province amateur side in the meantime, but a superb 2008 season raised his value. In that season he scored his maiden first-class century and contributed several useful scores in the middle order.

Biography 
Canning grew up in Edgemead, Cape Town, and played cricket for Pinelands Cricket Club. He was then signed by the Cape Cobras as a prospect. He featured in a few games in the Supersport series in October 2010, and scored a half-century against the Highveld Lions. At the end of the 2009 season, the Cobras signed Dane Vilas – another wicket-keeper batsman – and Canning was subsequently released from his contract.

References

External links 
 
 

1984 births
Living people
South African cricketers
Western Province cricketers
Boland cricketers
Cape Cobras cricketers
Cricketers from Cape Town